Kreh may refer to:
Kreh, a village in Chan commune, Cambodia
KREH, a radio station in Texas, United States